Laura Hidalgo (1 May 1927 – 18 November 2005) was an Argentine actress.

Born in Chisinau, Bessarabia as Pesea Faerman Postolow, her family moved in 1931 to Buenos Aires , where she grew up. Hidalgo appeared in sixteen films in Mexico, Spain and Argentina. She often drew comparisons with the Austrian actress Hedy Lamarr, whom she resembled. In 1954, she was nominated for an Ariel Award for Best Actress for her performance in Las tres perfectas casadas (1953). She retired from acting in 1958, following her marriage to an architect, and settled in Mexico. Later in life, she moved to the United States.

Selected filmography

 Juan Mondiola (1950)
 The Orchid (1951)
 The Tunnel (1952)
 The Beast Must Die (1952)
 Las tres perfectas casadas (1953)
 Black Ermine (1953)
 María Magdalena (1954)
 Beyond Oblivion (1956)

References

Bibliography 
 Plazaola, Luis Trelles. South American Cinema.  La Editorial, UPR, 1989.

External links 

 

1927 births
2005 deaths
Romanian film actresses
Romanian Jews
Argentine film actresses
Argentine people of Romanian-Jewish descent
Jewish Argentine actresses
Romanian emigrants to Argentina
Romanian expatriates in Mexico
Argentine expatriates in Mexico